Late Pt. Vinayakbuva Utturkar (1914–1989) was a Hindustani classical music vocal performer. He was an 'A' grade artist of All India Radio (AIR), Dharwar and had also performed at AIR Delhi, Mumbai, Hyderabad and Pune.

Personal life
He was born in Miraj to Pt. Vishnu Keshav Utturkar (Joshi) and Laxmi Vishnu Utturkar (Joshi) in 1914. He was the only brother to his five sisters. He completed his education up to inter-science there. He then focused on Indian classical music as a career path. With a culture of music at home and an inherently excellent quality voice, he was well-received by critics and the public alike. He then moved to Belgaum and started teaching at Vanita Vidyalaya as a music instructor and teacher. He was married to Bageshri Utturkar (1924–2015). He died in September 1989 and was survived by his four sons, Ravindra, Vikas, Arun and Uday.

His maternal uncle was the freedom fighter Vasudev Balwant Gogate, also known as Hotson-Gogate for his attempted attack on the then-governor of Mumbai (Bombay), John Ernest Buttery Hotson, during India's struggle for freedom from the British. (See notes).

Training
His initial training in Indian classical vocal music was under his father, Pt. Vishnu Keshav Utturkar (Joshi). He took his advanced training under Pt. Mirashi Buwa, who himself was trained under Pt. Balakrishnabuwa Ichalkaranjikar of Gwalior gharana.

His father, Pt. Vishnu Keshav Utturkar (Joshi), was a disciple of Neelkanthbuva, who in turn was a disciple of Pt. Balakrishnabuwa Ichalkaranjikar.

Awards
He belonged to the Gwalior gharana (Pt. Balakrishnabuwa Ichalkaranjikar tradition). Among many of the awards conferred upon him for his excellence in vocal music, Utturkar was the recipient of the Academy award of Karnataka State Sangeet Nrutya Academy for the year 1979, awarded on 30 March 1980 at the hands of then-governor of Karnataka, Govind Narain. 

He had also performed in the Mysore Dasara festival.

Throughout his musical career, Utturkar was accompanied by many renowned musicians such as Ustad Ahmed Jan Thirakwa, R. K. Bijapure and many others, at public performances and at All India Radio.

Pupils
One of Utturkar's pupils is a well-known Indian classical musician and violinist, Pt. Ratnakar Gokhale.

References

External links
http://allaboutbelgaum.com/lifestyle/stars-of-belgaum/pandit-r-k-bijapure-maha-meru-of-samvadini-harmonium/

Notes
Bulletin of International News (Royal Institute of International Affairs), vol. 8 (1931-1932), p. 86.
Y.D. Phadke, Senapati Bapat: Portrait of a Revolutionary (Bombay: Senapati Bapat Centenary Celebration Samiti, 1981), p. 48.

Gwalior gharana
1989 deaths
Year of birth uncertain
20th-century Indian male classical singers